Kerttu Kauniskangas (19 March 1920, Oulu – 25 October 1998) was a Finnish writer and recipient of the Eino Leino Prize in 1968.

References

1920 births
1998 deaths
People from Oulu
Finnish writers
Finnish communists
Writers from Northern Ostrobothnia
Recipients of the Eino Leino Prize